Maylee Atthin-Johnson (born 5 September 1986) is a Trinidadian footballer who played as a forward for the Trinidad and Tobago women's national team and has served as its captain.

International goals
Scores and results list Trinidad and Tobago' goal tally first.

References

External links 
 

1986 births
Living people
Women's association football midfielders
Trinidad and Tobago women's footballers
Sportspeople from Port of Spain
Trinidad and Tobago women's international footballers
Pan American Games competitors for Trinidad and Tobago
Footballers at the 2011 Pan American Games
Footballers at the 2015 Pan American Games
Competitors at the 2010 Central American and Caribbean Games
Cumberland University alumni
Kennesaw State Owls women's soccer players
Trinidad and Tobago expatriate women's footballers
Trinidad and Tobago expatriate sportspeople in the United States
Expatriate women's soccer players in the United States